Manchester Baseball Club is one of the largest baseball clubs in the north of England, with two senior teams and four youth teams playing in the British Baseball Federation leagues.  The club can trace its roots back as far as 1947, with the formation of the Stretford Saints.  Although the Saints club folded in 1973, the name hung around, with the Trafford Saints youth team playing during the 1990s with reasonable success.  Trafford merged with the senior Manchester team in 2000, creating the MBC as it is today.

Brief History
1847 Baseball is first played in GB by touring teams
1890 Baseball Association of GB formed
1934 Baseball started in North West. Sir John Moore of Littlewoods starts the NBA National Baseball Association
1936 Professional leagues formed, Derby, Manchester, Stoke, Preston & Aston Villa 
1937 First Baseball camp at Aston Villa, Pro league games attracting crowds of 30k
1938 England beat USA in the first World Amateur Championships. School leagues formed.
1939 Local companies Kellogs, Ferranti, GUS field teams. North West fields strong teams from  Rugby & Football, Dixie Dean of Everton feature professional players & its popular in HM forces.
1946 GB Amateur League formed, BBF established.
1947 STRETFORD Saints Baseball Club formed including American service men
1952 Team based at Turn Moss in July
1953 Exhibition games at Longford Park, LCCC and Ashton Park on Coronation Day
1962 Over 30 members at Stretford the strongest in the North of England
1963 As a Member of the British Baseball Federation entered in the European Championship in the Netherlands
1964 National League Champions beating Nottingham 37-0 at Knutsford
1965 Stretford Saints continue to play at Turn Moss in North West Amateur League
1966 Stretford Saints National Champions
1994 Youth Teams started TRAFFORD SAINTS, at Turn Moss Stretford. BBC feature Trafford Baseball on National TV. Saints won the championship 4 years in a row. 
2000 Senior and Juniors merge, change name to Manchester Baseball Club.
2015 Manchester A's win National AA Finals with wins over Latino Boys in Semi Finals and Enfield Dragons in the Final.
2018 Manchester A's win AA Northern League
2019 Manchester Baseball Club announce name change of the Torrent to the Bee's to honour the victims of the Manchester Arena attack.
2019 Manchester A's win AA Northern League and crowned AA Champions winning 2-1 against Liverpool Twojans.

Senior Teams
Around the turn of the 21st century, the senior first team was known as the Manchester Express, after a sponsorship deal with equipment supplier Baseball Express.  After the 2003 season, the Express became the Eagles, with the erstwhile A's remaining as the second team.  Also at this time a third team, the Torrent, was created to give less experienced players a chance to develop their skills.  In the winter of 08/09, the Eagles were disbanded and the A's became the senior squad, and the Torrent entered the BBF leagues for the first time after previously only playing friendly matches.

As of the start of the 2010 season, the A's are playing in the Northern division of the British AAA league, and the Torrent compete in the Northern division of the British AA league.

2009 season
2009 was a season of mixed fortunes for the MBC teams.  The A's made it to the AA Final Four Tournament after finishing third in the Northern League with a record of 18-6.  They also finished in 3rd place at the Final Four after losing to the Mildenhall Bulldogs before beating the Kent Mariners.  The Torrent had a tough first league season, winning only five games and suffering several forfeits.  They ended the league season in 9th place out of ten teams, but will hope to come back stronger in 2010 after a league reshuffle left them with much more favourable opposition.

2010 season
2010 saw the A's finish with a 14-10 record, and a second third-place finish it 2 seasons for the A's, although with qualification criteria upped to the AAA level this season they did not make the cut for Final Four Tournament.
The Torrent built upon last seasons beginnings and finished with a 9-13 record, having let the division in the summer months only to struggle late in the season and finish only above local rivals Oldham Northstars.

Junior Teams
The Manchester Saints have junior teams in three age groups for 2010: Rookie for 7-10s, Pony for 10-13s and Bronco for 13-16s.

References

External links
 Manchester Baseball Club
 Baseball Softball UK

Baseball teams in England
Sport in Manchester
Baseball teams established in 1947
1947 establishments in England
Baseball teams in the United Kingdom